Paul Walker' (born 18 April 1992) is a footballer who plays as a goalkeeper. Born in England, he made two appearances for the Wales U17 national team.

Career
Walker was the latest in the production line of young goalkeepers at Sixfields following Mark Bunn and Chris Dunn. Walker, along with Alex Konstantinou and Michael Jacobs, were awarded professional contracts for the 2010-11 season. He made his Football League debut on 25 April 2011 as a second-half substitute for Steve Collis in a match against Stockport County.

On 31 January 2011 Walker and teammate Ashley Corker were released by mutual consent from the Cobblers.

International career
He has played for the Wales national under-17 football team, having been capped twice and has been called up to the Under 19 national team.

References

External links

Northampton Town official club profile

1992 births
Living people
English footballers
Association football goalkeepers
Northampton Town F.C. players
English Football League players
Corby Town F.C. players